Ill Na Na is the debut studio album by American rapper Foxy Brown. It was released on November 19, 1996, by Def Jam Recordings. It was reissued on September 29, 1997, in the UK with an addition of the song "Big Bad Mamma". Brown began working on the album after being discovered by the production team Trackmasters and appearing on a number of singles by other artists, such as LL Cool J, Case and Jay Z. The immediate success of the singles led to a bidding war at the beginning of 1996, and in March, Def Jam Recordings won and signed the then 17-year-old rapper to the label. Mostly produced by Trackmasters, Ill Na Na features guest appearances from Blackstreet, Havoc, Method Man, Kid Capri and Jay Z. Lyrically, the album mainly focuses on themes of fashion, sex and mafia.

Ill Na Na debuted at number seven on the Billboard 200 with 128,000 copies sold in its first week. It has sold over a 1.4 million copies and was certified platinum by the Recording Industry Association of America (RIAA). The album also includes other certifications such as; Gold in Music Canada (MC) for selling over 50,000 and Silver in British Phonographic Industry (BPI) for selling over 60,000.

Three singles were released from the album. "Get Me Home" was released on September 15, 1996. It peaked at number 42 on the Billboard Radio Songs chart. The second single, "I'll Be", released on March 4, 1997, also noted a commercial success. It peaked at number seven on the Billboard Hot 100, becoming Brown's highest charting single. The song was ranked number 52 on VH1's 100 Greatest Hip-Hop Songs. Another song, "Big Bad Mamma" was released July 28, 1997, and was featured on the soundtrack to the film How to Be a Player (1997). Though not released on the original album, it was added to the European reissue in 1997. It peaked at number 53 on the Billboard Hot 100.

The album pushed and broke boundaries for female rappers. It became the first female rap album to debut in the top 10 of the Billboard 200, the first female rap album to have certified plaques outside the U.S., and highest selling and fastest female rap album of 1996 to go Platinum within 2.7 months.

Background and recording
Between 1995 and 1996, Brown went into the recording studio to record her debut studio album, originally set to be released in October 1996. The album featured guest appearances by Blackstreet, Havoc, Method Man, Kid Capri, and Jay-Z with a majority of the production by the Trackmasters. Ill Na Na produced two hit singles, "Get Me Home" featuring Blackstreet, and "I'll Be" featuring Jay-Z. Ill Na Na was re-released in 1997. The song "I'll Be" was ranked number 52 on VH1's "100 Greatest Hip-Hop Songs" list in 2008.

Singles
"Get Me Home" is the first single from Ill Na Na. The song peaked at number 42 on the U.S. Billboard Radio Songs charts and number 10 on the U.S. Billboard R&B charts.

"I'll Be" is the second single released from Ill Na Na, produced by the Trackmasters and featuring Jay-Z. Released on March 4, 1997, "I'll Be" quickly became a hit, peaking at 7 on the Billboard Hot 100, at the time becoming both Foxy Brown and Jay-Z's highest charting single. Two months after its release on May 2, "I'll Be" was certified gold by the RIAA for sales of over 500,000 copies. To date it remains Foxy Brown's only song to earn a certification.

"Big Bad Mamma" is the final single on the Ill Na Na, performed by American rapper Foxy Brown and American R&B group Dru Hill and from the soundtrack to the 1997 film, How to Be a Player. The song also appeared on the re-issue of Ill Na Na. The song, which was produced by the Trackmasters and based around an interpolation of Carl Carlton's "She's a Bad Mama Jama", became a semi-successful hit, peaking at 53 on the Billboard Hot 100, Foxy's second highest charting single as a solo artist. The single was released with the then reunited EPMD's "Never Seen Before" as the B-side.

Commercial performance
In the United States, Ill Na Na debuted at number seven on the Billboard 200 and at number two on the Top R&B/Hip-Hop Albums chart, selling 128,000 copies in its first week, and was certified platinum by the Recording Industry Association of America (RIAA) within three months of its release. According to Nielsen SoundScan, the album has sold over 1,450,834 copies in the United States. In Canada, it was certified gold by the Canadian Recording Industry Association (CRIA). In the United Kingdom, it debuted at number 98 on the UK Albums Chart and was certified silver by the British Phonographic Industry (BPI).

Ill Na Na's success made Foxy Brown the first solo female rapper to receive such global mainstream success. The album charted for 43 Weeks in the United States, 43 Weeks in Germany, 23 Weeks in Canada, 20 Weeks in The United Kingdom, and 6 Weeks in The Netherlands. Ill Na Na has sold 6 Million WorldWide.

Track listing

Sample credits
 "Intro...Chicken Coop" contains a sample of "I Want to Make Love to You So Bad" performed by Isaac Hayes. Also contains interpolations of Just Another Case Cru & "Dead Man Walking" by Cormega.
 "(Holy Matrimony) Letter to The Firm" contains samples of "Ike's Mood" performed by Isaac Hayes and "I Love You" by Mary J. Blige.
 "Foxy's Bells" contains a sample of "Rock the Bells" performed by LL Cool J.
 "Get Me Home" contains a sample of "Gotta Get You Home Tonight" performed by Eugene Wilde.
 "If I..." contains a sample of "Any Love" performed by Luther Vandross. 
 "Ill Na Na" contains a sample of "Brick House" performed by Commodores.
 "No One's" contains a sample of "No One's Gonna Love You" performed by SOS Band.
 "I'll Be" contains a sample of "I'll Be Good" performed by René & Angela.
 "Outro" contains a sample of "I Want to Make Love to You So Bad" performed by Isaac Hayes.

Notes
Some enhanced editions of the album include the music videos for "I'll Be" & "Get Me Home" as tracks fifteen and sixteen.

Personnel
Adapted from the Ill Na Na liner notes.

 Executive Producers: Chris Lighty, Steve Stoute and Trackmasters
 A&R Direction: Chris Lighty and David Lighty
 Management: Don Pooh Management
 Mastering: Tom Coyne
 Art Direction and Design: Drawing Board Design
 Photography: Michael Levine

Charts

Weekly charts

Year-end charts

Certifications and sales

References

External links
[ Ill Na Na] at AllMusic

1996 debut albums
Foxy Brown (rapper) albums
Def Jam Recordings albums
Albums produced by Teddy Riley
Albums produced by Trackmasters
Albums recorded at Chung King Studios